John Broman (born 1958) is an American former ski jumper. His sons Anders and Bjorn are division 1 basketball athletes at Winthrop University.

World Cup

Standings

Wins

References

1958 births
Living people
American male ski jumpers
Sportspeople from Duluth, Minnesota